The Boors, also known as The Cantankerous Men (Venetian: I rusteghi), is a comedy by Carlo Goldoni. It was first performed at the San Luca theatre of Venice towards the end of the Carnival in 1760. It was published in 1762. The 'boors' are four merchants of Venice, who represent the old conservative, puritanical tradition of the Venetian middle classes, who are pitted against Venice's "new frivolity".

References

Bibliography
 

Plays by Carlo Goldoni
1760 plays
Comedy plays
Plays set in Italy